This is a complete list of people who have served as Lord Lieutenant of West Sussex since the creation of the office and the county on 1 April 1974:

1 April 1974 – 31 January 1975: Bernard Fitzalan-Howard, 16th Duke of Norfolk (previously Lord Lieutenant of Sussex)  
19 May 1975 – 1990: Lavinia Fitzalan-Howard, Duchess of Norfolk
23 March 1990 – 1994: Charles Gordon-Lennox, 10th Duke of Richmond
29 July 1994 – 1999: Major-General Sir Philip John Newling Ward
12 July 1999 – 2008: Hugh Wyatt
24 November 2008 - 2022: Dame Susan Pyper
23 May 2022 - present: Lady Emma Barnard

References

Sussex, West
Politics of West Sussex
1974 establishments in England